FERM domain-containing protein 6 is a protein that in humans is encoded by the FRMD6 gene.

References

Further reading